Gargela xanthocasis is a moth in the family Crambidae. It was described by Edward Meyrick in 1897. It is found on the Sangir Islands of Indonesia.

References

Crambinae
Moths described in 1897
Moths of Indonesia